Neal Luit Evenhuis (born Kornelus Luit Evenhuis on 16 April 1952;) is an American entomologist. He works at the Bishop Museum in Hawaii. Evenhuis has described over 500 species of insects since 1976, and is known both for his research and peculiar binomial names.

Education and career 

Evenhuis was born in Southern California to parents who had immigrated to California from the Netherlands in 1938. In 1974, he received a Bachelor of Science degree in Botany and Entomology from California State Polytechnic University in Pomona. In 1976, he started working as a scientific illustrator at the Bernice Pauahi Bishop Museum. Two years later, he graduated with a Master's degree in Biology. Within a few years, he embarked on his own research by studying the taxonomy of Pacific flies. In 1988, he received a Ph.D. degree in Entomology at the University of Hawaiʻi at Mānoa and was soon promoted to full Entomologist. He has since described more than 500 new species of insects and authored more than 350 scientific publications, specializing in the families Bombyliidae and Mythicomyiidae. In 1992, he received the Thomas Say Award for his research by the Entomological Society of America. He is interested in the history of dipterology and nomenclature, and is a former president of the International Commission on Zoological Nomenclature. Evenhuis also campaigns for teaching school children to discern native species from alien species.

Taxonomy humor 

In the entomological community, Evenhuis is also known for his sense of humor, and binomial names coined by him have attracted attention. After identifying a bombyliid from the genus Phthiria in 1985, he decided to name it Phthiria relativitae as a pun on theory of relativity. To ensure publication of the name in a scientific journal and thus its acceptance while avoiding criticism of English-speaking scientists, he had to submit it to a Polish journal. In 2002, he named a genus of extinct mythicomyiids Carmenelectra in honour of the model Carmen Electra's "splendid" body. The same year, he described Pieza kake ("piece of cake"), Pieza pi ("pizza pie"), Pieza rhea ("pizzeria"), and Pieza deresistans ("pièce de résistance"), as well as Reissa roni (named after Rice-A-Roni). In 2013, he named a new species of fly from French Polynesia as Campsicnemus popeye for its resemblance with the cartoon character Popeye in having swollen forearms.

Frisbee record 

On 12 May 1980, he set a record in flying disc games, which he held for 20 years.

References

External links 

Neal L. Evenhuis profile at Hawaii Biological Survey
Family-group names, genus-group names and species-group names (new taxa described by Neal L. Evenhuis)

1952 births
American entomologists
American people of Dutch descent
Living people
California State Polytechnic University, Pomona alumni
University of Hawaiʻi at Mānoa alumni
University of Hawaiʻi faculty
Scientists from California
People from Upland, California